is a Japanese television drama series based on the 2010 German television series Der letzte Bulle. The Japanese version was developed by Nippon TV and Hulu Japan. The first episode premiered on NTV on 19 June 2015. It received a viewership rating of 12.9%. The rest of six episodes are streaming on Hulu Japan.

Toshiaki Karasawa played the lead role of the detective Kōsuke Kyōgoku who was in coma for 30 years, and Nozomi Sasaki played his daughter. Yuki Saito, who sang a hit song in the 1980s, also appeared as a guest role.

In September 2016, the omnibus edition The Last Cop: episode 0 premiered with three episodes. A new television series was scheduled to air in October 2016.

Cast

 Toshiaki Karasawa as Kōsuke Kyōgoku, a detective awakened from 30 years coma
 Masataka Kubota as Ryōta Mochizuki, a young detective and Kyōgoku's partner
 Nozomi Sasaki as Yui Suzuki, Kyōgoku's daughter
 Ichirōta Miyakawa as Makoto Suzuki, a detective married Kyōgoku's ex-wife
 Emi Wakui as Kanako Suzuki, Kyōgoku's ex-wife
 Shirō Sano as Yūji Endō, a chief of police
 Yuki Saito as herself (guest appearance)
 Funassyi (guest appearance)

References

External links
  
  
 

Japanese drama television series
2015 in Japanese television
2016 in Japanese television
2015 Japanese television series debuts
2016 Japanese television series endings
Nippon TV dramas
Hulu Japan
Comedy-drama television series
Japanese crime television series
Japanese time travel television series
Television shows set in Yokohama
Japanese television series based on non-Japanese television series
Television series set in 1985
Television series set in 2015